An aula regia (lat. for "royal hall"), also referred to as a palas hall, is a name given to the great hall in an imperial or royal palace (German Kaiserpfalz). In the Middle Ages the term was also used as a synonym for the Pfalz itself.

An example of a surviving aula regia is the church of Santa María del Naranco near Oviedo, built around 850 as an aula regia for Ramiro I. There was also an aula regia in the Palace of Aachenː it later became a part of the medieval Town Hall of Aachen. The royal hall of the Kaiserpfalz at Ingelheim has been digitally reconstructed. The architectural prototype for all of them was the Basilica of Constantine in Trier.

The reception room in the Domus Flavia, the palace of Domitian on the Palatine Hill in Rome, is also called the Aula Regia.

References

Medieval architecture
Rooms
Latin words and phrases